I-65, later renumbered  I-165, was an Imperial Japanese Navy Kaidai type cruiser submarine commissioned in 1932.  A KD5 sub-class submarine, she served during World War II, supporting Japanese forces in the invasion of Malaya and the Dutch East Indies campaign, participating in the Battle of Midway, and patrolling in the Indian Ocean and Pacific Ocean before she was sunk in 1945. In 1944, her crew committed a war crime, massacring the survivors of the merchant ship Nancy Moller.

Design and description
The submarines of the KD5 sub-class were improved versions of the preceding KD4 sub-class. They displaced  surfaced and  submerged. The submarines had a diving depth of 

For surface running, the submarines were powered by two  diesel engines, each driving one propeller shaft. When submerged, each propeller was driven by a  electric motor. They could reach  on the surface and  underwater.

The submarines were armed with six internal  torpedo tubes, four in the bow and two in the stern. They carried a total of 14 torpedoes. They were also armed with one  deck gun and a  machine gun.

Construction and career
Built at the Kure Naval Arsenal, laid down as I-65 on 19 December 1929, launched on 2 June 1931 and completed on 1 December 1932. Lt Cdr Hankyu Sasaki was her first commanding officer and she was assigned to Submarine Division 30. On 20 August 1941, just prior to the outbreak of the war in the Pacific, Lt Cdr Harada Hakue is appointed commanding officer. She was part of the 5th Submarine Squadron.

1941
Her first mission was on 8 December 1941 as part of Operation "E" – the Japanese invasion of Malaya.

On 13 December 1941 she provided cover for Japanese landings on North Borneo.

1942
On 9 January 1942 while on patrol in the Java Sea she torpedoed, shelled and sank the 1,003-ton Dutch steamship Benkoelen that was en route from Soemenep to Cheribon at 04-50S, 112-50E. On 14 January 1942 at 0217 (JST) in the Indian Ocean west of the Mentawai Islands at 00-12S, 97-00E she torpedoed and sank the 5,102-ton British-Indian armed merchant Jalarahan which was en route from Singapore to Calcutta. She then returned to Penang on 20 January 1942 becoming the first Japanese submarine to arrive there.

On her third patrol between 5 February and 28 February she torpedoed and damaged the British converted boom carrier Laomedon 45 miles SE of Ceylon. In the Arabian Sea on 15 February she torpedoed and sank the 4,681-ton Johanne Justesen and on 20 February in the Indian Ocean, torpedoed and sank the 5,280-ton British merchant Bhima. She attacked another merchant ship on 21 February, but missed with her torpedoes.

Redesignated I-165 on 20 May, she was moved to Kwajalein on 24 May and was put on patrol during the Battle of Midway north of Kure Island. On 30 June Commander Torisu Kennosuke (鳥巣　建之助) (may also be known as Tatenosuke Tosu) became the commanding officer and on 10 July she was reassigned to the Southwest Area Fleet.

Returning to Penang on 6 August she began a new patrol of the Indian Ocean on 11 August. On 25 August torpedoed and sank the 5,237-ton British armed merchant Harmonides. A short time later she suffered storm damage and was forced to return to Penang having avoided a searching flying boat and British destroyer. She arrived at Penang on 31 August.

With the damage repaired she left Penang on 16 September with five Indian National Army insurgents on board. They were to be landed on the north-west coast of India. On the way torpedoed and sank the American armed freighter Losmar and claimed to have sunk another merchant ship the following day. The insurgents were landed in an inflatable without being observed. She then returned to Penang.

In November and December she was based in Surabaya to counter a rumored American landing on Timor. The landing did not eventuate and she returned to Penang.

1943
In January she was sent to bombard Geraldton, Western Australia, as a diversionary raid to assist with the evacuation of Japanese troops through the Sunda Strait. After narrowly avoiding patrolling destroyers and aircraft Kennosuke decided to attack nearby Port Gregory instead. He mistook the local fish cannery for an ammunition plant and bombarded it with 10 shells from the submarines Type 88  deck gun. The gun had a  range. She returned to Surabaya on 16 February.

On 25 May Lieutenant Commander  Shimizu Tsuruzo became her commanding officer and on 9 October she was reassigned to 8th Submarine Squadron. On 16 December, while sailing from Singapore to Penang she was attacked by an Allied submarine. The submarine′s torpedoes missed and she arrived safely on 18 December.

1944
A member of I-165′s crew called out from her conning tower for Nancy Moller′s captain and chief engineer to identify themselves, but received no response. I-165 came alongside a raft and interrogated its occupants about the whereabouts of the captain and cheif engineer, receiving the standard response that both had died in the sinking, as Allied merchant ship crews were trained to do. I-165′s crew then brought the raft's six occupants aboard, took gunlayer Dennis Fryer below as a prisoner-of-war, forced the other five men from the raft — two Chinese and three Indian sailors — to kneel on deck, shot the two Chinese in the back and kicked them overboard, and pushed the three Indians overboard without shooting them. I-165 then spent ten minutes moving slowly through debris and the life rafts, nudging wreckage aside and machine-gunning every Nancy Moller survivor she could find in the water before departing the area, disappearing over the horizon two hours after she ended her attack on the survivors. For the remainder of I-165′s patrol, the Japanese subjected Fryer to harsh, continuous questioning, and after I-165 returned to Penang, he was imprisoned there and placed on a starvation diet for three months, then transferred to a jail in Singapore, from which he was freed at the end of the war. Of the crew of 55 and seven gunners aboard Nancy Moller, only 32 men other than Fryer survived her sinking and the subsequent massacre. The Royal Navy light cruiser  rescued them from four life rafts on 22 March and put them ashore at Port Louis, Mauritius, on 26 March 1944.

On 12 August I-165 was sent from Surabaya on a rescue and resupply mission to Korim Bay. She arrived on 18 August and after unsuccessfully attempting to contact the troops at Korim Point came under attack by three subchasers. She was heavily depth-charged and developed a major leak to her engine room. Ten hours after the attack began she surfaced and headed to Ambon for temporary repairs arriving there on 23 August. She then returned to the Sasebo Naval Arsenal for repair and an overhaul. Lieutenant Commander Ono Yasushi took over command and she was reassigned to Submarine Division 19 as training ship.

1945

Converted to a Kaiten mother ship and fitted with Type 3 Mark 1 Model 3 "13-Go" air-search radar, she was returned to active service with the 6th Fleet's Submarine Division 34.

Sinkings
Sank Dutch merchant ship Benkoelen on 9 January 1942
Sank Indian merchant ship Jalarajan on 15 January 1942
Sank Netherlands merchant Johanne Justesen on 15 February 1942
Sank RMS Bhima on 20 February 1942
Sank SS Harmonides on 25 August 1942
Sank SS Losmar on 24 September 1942
Shelled Port Gregory on 28 January 1943
Sank RMS Perseus on 16 January 1944
Sank SS Nancy Moller on 18 March 1944

References

Footnotes

Bibliography
 

 

1931 ships
Ships built by Kure Naval Arsenal
World War II submarines of Japan
Kaidai-class submarines
Ships of the Battle of Midway
Maritime incidents in March 1944
Maritime incidents in June 1945
Submarines sunk by aircraft
Ships sunk by US aircraft
Japanese war crimes